High Cross is the name given to the crossroads of the Roman roads of Watling Street and Fosse Way in Leicestershire, England. It is about a mile west of the village of Claybrooke Magna and was in the hundred of Guthlaxton. It was the site of a Romano-British settlement known as Venonae or Venonis, with a nearby fort.

The remains of Venonis fort lies beneath the surface in a field to the south-east of the crossroads adjacent to the tree line and are visible from satellite images. The location of the fort was also shown on a map drawn by William Stukely in the eighteenth century when structures were more clearly visible . Excavations were carried out by Arthur Pickering in the 1930s in the region of the crossroads but not the area of the fort itself.

High Cross stone monument was built in 1712. Funded by the Earl of Denbigh it celebrated the victories against France by the Duke of Blenheim as well as marking the centre of Roman Britain. It consisted of four Doric columns with an orb and cross above. It was struck by lightning in 1791 and only the plinth remains today. The stone monument was preceded by a wooden cross and was the site of a medieval gibbet.

In modern times, this section of Watling Street is now a dual carriageway section of the A5, the southern part of the Fosse Way is a B road, and the northern route of the Fosse is now a track which is a part of a long-distance path called the Leicestershire Round.

High Cross is depicted on the coat of arms of Blaby District Council, which is the local authority for the area. Two black diagonal lines on the shield represent Fosse Way and Watling Street.

References

External links

The Mirror of Literature, Amusement, and Instruction, Vol. X, No. 272, published 8 September 1827
Burbage the Centre of England, Sylvia Whitworth, Burbage Heritage group.

Geography of Leicestershire
Transport in Leicestershire
History of Leicestershire
Scheduled monuments in Leicestershire